Friedrich Bleek (4 July 1793, in Ahrensbök in Holstein (a village near Lübeck)27 February 1859, in Bonn), was a German Biblical scholar.

Life
At 16 Bleek's father sent him to the gymnasium at Lübeck, where he became so interested in ancient languages that he abandoned his idea of a legal career and resolved to devote himself to the study of theology. After spending some time at the university of Kiel, he went to Berlin, where, from 1814 to 1817, he studied under De Wette, Neander and Schleiermacher. So highly were his merits appreciated by his professors — Schleiermacher was accustomed to say that he possessed a special charisma for the science of Introduction — that in 1818 after he had passed the examinations for entering the ministry he was recalled to Berlin as a Repentant or tutorial fellow in theology, a temporary post which the theological faculty had obtained for him.

Besides discharging his duties in the theological seminary, he published two dissertations in Schleiermacher's and GCF Lücke's Journal (1819-1820, 1822), one on the origin and composition of the Sibylline Oracles, Über die Entstehung und Zusammensetzung der Sibyllinischen Orakel, and another on the authorship and design of the Book of Daniel, Über Verfasser und Zweck des Buches Daniel. These articles attracted much attention, and were distinguished by those qualities of solid learning, thorough investigation and candour of judgment which characterized all his writings.

Bleek's merits as a rising scholar were recognized by the minister of public instruction, who continued his stipend as Repentant for a third year, and promised further advancement in due time. But the attitude of the political authority underwent a change. De Wette was dismissed from his professorship in 1819, and Bleek, a favorite pupil, incurred the suspicion of the government as an extreme democrat. Not only was his stipend as Repentant discontinued, but his nomination to the office of professor extraordinarius, which had already been signed by the minister Karl Altenstein, was withheld. At length it was found that Bleek had been confounded with a certain Baueleven Blech, and in 1823 he received the appointment.

During the six years that Bleek remained at Berlin, he twice declined a call to the office of professor ordinarius of theology, once to Greifswald and once to Kanigsberg. In 1829, however, he was induced to accept Lücke's chair in the recently founded University of Bonn, and entered upon his duties there in the summer of the same year. For thirty years he laboured with ever-increasing success, due not to any attractions of manner or to the enunciation of novel or bizarre opinions, but to the soundness of his investigations, the impartiality of his judgments, and the clearness of his method. In 1843 he was raised to the office of consistorial councillor, and was selected by the university to hold the office of rector, a distinction which has not since been conferred upon any theologian of the Reformed Church. He died suddenly of apoplexy on 27 February 1859.

Bleek's works belong entirely to the departments of Biblical criticism and exegesis. His views on questions of Old Testament criticism were advanced in his own day; for on all the disputed points concerning the unity and authorship of the books of the Old Covenant he was opposed to received opinion. But with respect to the New Testament his position was conservative. An opponent of the Tübingen school, his defence of the genuineness and authenticity of the gospel of St John is among the ablest that have been written; and although on some minor points his views did not altogether coincide with, those of the traditional school, his critical labors on the New Testament must nevertheless be regarded as among the most important contributions to the maintenance of orthodox opinions.

His greatest work, his commentary on the epistle to the Hebrews (Brief an die Hebraer erlautert durch Einleilung, Ubersetzung, und fortlaufenden Commentar, in three parts, 1828, 1836 and 1840) won the highest praise from men like De Wette and Fr. Delitzsch. This work was abridged by Bleek for his college lectures, and was published in that condensed form in 1868. In 1846 he published his contributions to the criticism, of the gospels (Beiträge zur Evangelien Kritik, pt. i.), which contained his defence of St John's gospel, and arose out of a review of JHA Ebrard's Wissenschaflliche Kritik der Evangelischen Geschichte (1842).

Posthumously-published works
The following works were published after Bleek's death:
His Introduction to the Old Testament (Einleitung in das Alte Testament), (3rd ed., 1869); En,g. trans. by GH Venables (from 2nd ed., 1869); in 1878 a new edition (the 4th) appeared, under the editorship of Julius Wellhausen, who made extensive alterations and additions
his Introduction to the New Testament (3rd ed., W Mangold, 1875), Eng. trans. (from 2nd German ed.) by William Urwick (1869, 1870)
his Exposition of the First Three Gospels (Synoptische Erklärung der drei ersten Evangelien), by H Holtzmann (1862)
his Lectures on the Apocalypse (Vorlesungen über die Apokalypse), (Eng. trans. 1875). Besides these there has also appeared a small volume containing Lectures on Colossians, Philemon and Ephesians (Berlin, 1865)
Bleek also contributed many articles to the Studien und Kritiken. For further information on Bleek's life and writings, see Kamphausen's article in Herzog-Hauck, Realencyklopädie; Frédéric Lichtenberger's Histoire des idées religieuses en Allemagne, vol. iii.; Diestel's Geschichte des Alten Testamentes (1869); and TK Cheyne's Founders of Old Testament Criticism (1893).

References

1793 births
1859 deaths
German biblical scholars
19th-century German Protestant theologians
Academic staff of the University of Bonn
19th-century German male writers
19th-century German writers
German male non-fiction writers